John Friend Mahoney (August 1, 1889 – February 23, 1957) was an American physician best known as a pioneer in the treatment of syphilis with penicillin. He won the 1946 Lasker Award.

Early life and education
The son of David and Mary Ann Mahoney, John Friend Mahoney was born on August 1, 1889, in Fond du Lac, Wisconsin. In 1914 Mahoney graduated from Marquette University with attached clinical training at the Milwaukee County Hospital and at the Chicago Lying-in Hospital.

Career
From 1917 he worked as an assistant surgeon in the U.S. forces in Europe during World War I. After returning in 1919, he served in the United States Public Health Service on various quarantine stations and marine hospitals, including Ellis Island. In this context, Mahoney was sent to Europe from 1925 to 1929. While in England, Ireland and Germany, Mahoney studied syphilis treatment.

In 1929 Mahoney became director of the Venereal Disease Research Laboratory of the Food and Drug Administration. The laboratory improved serological tests for syphilis and demonstrated, with the advent of sulfonamide treatment in the United States in the 1930s, its efficacy in treating gonorrhea. He was also medical director of the Marine Hospital in Staten Island.

Mahoney was made aware of the possibilities of penicillin treatment by a paper by Wallace Herrell and colleagues from the Mayo Clinic. Particular attention was on the treatment of gonorrhea patients where the pathogen was resistant to sulfonamides. Mahoney confirmed this and also began to test penicillin for syphilis treatment, first in vitro without success, then in rabbits. He led the Terre Haute Prison experiments and supervised Dr. John C. Cutler in the Guatemala Syphilis Experiment. By 1929, Dr. Mahoney worked as the director of the Venereal Disease Research Lab in Staten Island, where the Terre Haute experiments began in 1943; this is also where Cutler first assisted him. 

After stopping the Terre Haute experiments for lack of accurate infection of subjects with gonorrhea, Dr. Mahoney moved on to study the effects of penicillin on syphilis. His research found huge success for penicillin treatments and the U.S. Army embraced it in STD prescription. Although this seemed prosperous, Mahoney and his collaborators questioned the long term effectiveness of eliminating the disease altogether in individuals. Mahoney, Cutler and other researchers felt that a smaller, more controlled group of individuals to study would be more helpful in finding this cure. This led to the use of citizens in Guatemala as subjects; once this approach was proven successful he began clinical trials. 

At a meeting of the American Public Health Association in New York in October 1943, Mahoney presented the first results of his research in four patients in the early stages of syphilis disease. Time magazine reported the findings. With Mahoney's involvement, the Committee on Medical Research began an extensive clinical trial with over 1400 patients in different hospitals. Mahoney led the study at the Staten Island Marine Hospital. In June 1944, penicillin was introduced as a standard treatment for syphilis in the United States Army.

In 1946 Mahoney was one of the first winners of the Lasker Award, which recognizes significant contribution to medical science. In 1948 he was chairman of the World Health Organization Expert Committee on Venereal Diseases at its first meeting in Geneva, Switzerland. In December 1949 he retired from the Public Health Service. In 1950 he was appointed commissioner of the New York City Department of Health, serving until 1954. He returned to the department's Bureau of Laboratories, serving as its director until his death in 1957.

Personal life
He was married and had a son and daughter.

References

Bibliography
 John Parascandola: John Mahoney and the introduction of penicillin to treat syphilis
 Obituary in the British Journal of Venereal Diseases (PDF), Band 33, 1957, S. 127.

American public health doctors
1889 births
1957 deaths
People from Fond du Lac, Wisconsin
Physicians from New York City
Marquette University alumni
Physicians from Wisconsin
Military personnel from Wisconsin
Recipients of the Lasker-DeBakey Clinical Medical Research Award
Commissioners of Health of the City of New York
United States Public Health Service Commissioned Corps officers
Burials at Arlington National Cemetery